Zagloba satana is a species of lady beetle in the family Coccinellidae. It is found in North America.

References

Coccinellidae
Beetles described in 1985